The Dumping Ground (also informally referred to as The DG) is a British children's television drama series that focuses on the lives and experiences of young people who live in a children's home with their care workers in care. The series currently has 10 seasons and airs on CBBC. The series is a continuation of Tracy Beaker Returns and the first series, consisting of thirteen, thirty-minute episodes, was commissioned in early 2012. A second series, also with thirteen, thirty-minute episodes, was announced in May 2013. The third and fourth series, announced in 2015 and 2016 respectively, both had an increase in episodes: twenty, thirty-minute episodes. In 2018, it was confirmed that two further series, with 24 episodes in each series, would be made.

The Dumping Ground broadcast its 100th episode on 16 March 2018, which was the tenth episode of series six.

The tenth and current series began airing on 30 September 2022, as of Series 10, there are 192 episodes of The Dumping Ground. Series 10 will contain the show's 200th episode.

Plot
The series revolves around the life of children in a care home; typically each episode follows one or more characters' life and includes subplots featuring other characters. The Dumping Ground deals with issues related to the care system as well as social issues such as friendships, family, relationships, mental health, adolescence, racism and LGBT parenting.

Production
The first series was produced in summer 2012 at the former La Sagesse convent school in the Jesmond area of Newcastle-upon-Tyne which had previously been used throughout Tracy Beaker Returns. The former Fathers' house was used as the exterior of Elm Tree House, whilst the show's interior scenes were filmed in a grander building elsewhere on the same site. Property owners Barratt Homes decided to redevelop the school buildings into a luxury housing estate following the first series and production was forced to move to another area of Newcastle. The recognisable cream and red exterior of Elm Tree House has since been demolished in 2014 though the building used for interior scenes partially remains intact.

Between series two and four, interior scenes were filmed at the former Hookergate School in High Spen, Gateshead, which had previously been used as the Bradlington High School in CBBC series Wolfblood. A nearby children's respite care home, Kites Rise, on Smaile's Lane in Rowlands Gill doubled as the exterior of new care home Ashdene Ridge. The move was addressed in the series 2 opener, in which residents and staff can be seen unpacking boxes and bags. The nearby housing estates in Rowlands Gill doubled as the fictional surrounding Talbot Ward area of Pottiswood, where the show is set. The exact location of Pottiswood has never been explicitly said within the programme, though landmarks such as the Tyne Bridge have been seen across the various series and characters have addressed the fact that they are in the North East of England. In Series 10, it is shown on a map to be north west of Ponteland in Northumberland. The garden exterior scenes were filmed against the back of a building at Hookergate School, and therefore did not accurately match the exterior of the front of Kites Rise.

From series five, the filming of interior care home scenes and garden scenes were moved to the former Loansdean Fire Station in Morpeth, Northumberland following Gateshead Council's decision to redevelop the Hookergate School. Kites Rise's façade continue to double as Ashdene Ridge. 

Principal filming returned to the Hookergate School in series 9, and following a change of ownership at Kites Rise a replica of the building's frontage was constructed around an old caretaker's house on the school site. The replica is noticeably smaller than the real building and in wide shots the adjoining garage can be seen just to be a wooden façade. The original chimney of the caretaker's house can be seen above the Ashdene Ridge roof. This arrangement continued into series 10.

Episodes

Cast

Awards and nominations

References

External links
 
 

 
2013 British television series debuts
2010s British children's television series
2010s British LGBT-related drama television series
2020s British children's television series
2020s British LGBT-related drama television series
CBBC shows
BBC children's television shows
English-language television shows
Lesbian-related television shows
Television series by BBC Studios
Television series about children
Television series about orphans
Television series about teenagers
Television shows set in Newcastle upon Tyne
Tracy Beaker series